Petrovce is a village and municipality in Vranov nad Topľou District in the Prešov Region of eastern Slovakia.

History
In historical records the village was first mentioned in 1412.

Geography
The village lies at an altitude of 325 metres and covers an area of 13.705 km2.
It has a population of about 440 people.

Ethnicity
The population is 99% Slovak in ethnicity.

Government
The village relies on the tax and district offices, and fire brigade at Michalovce and relies on the police force and birth registry at Trhovište.

Economy

Sports

Transport

External links
 
http://www.statistics.sk/mosmis/eng/run.html

Villages and municipalities in Vranov nad Topľou District
Šariš